Kilgore Trout is a fictional character created by author Kurt Vonnegut. In Vonnegut's work, Trout is a notably unsuccessful author of paperback science fiction novels.

"Trout" was inspired by the name of the author Theodore Sturgeon (Vonnegut's colleague in the genre of science fiction—Vonnegut was amused by the notion of a person with the name of a fish, Sturgeon, hence Trout), although Trout's consistent presence in Vonnegut's works has also led critics to view him as the author's own alter ego.

In a homage to Vonnegut, Kilgore Trout is also the titular author of the novel Venus on the Half-Shell (1975), written pseudonymously by Philip José Farmer.

Origins of the character
In 1957, Theodore Sturgeon moved to Truro, Massachusetts, where he befriended Vonnegut, then working as a salesman in a Saab dealership. At the time, both were writing in the genre of science fiction; Vonnegut had already published Player Piano, retitled Utopia 14 in paperback, while Sturgeon's then more-successful career (mainly as a short story writer) stretched back to 1938.  In fact, at the time of their initial meeting, Sturgeon was the most anthologized English-language science fiction author alive.

Sturgeon would continue writing, but his pace dipped noticeably after the end of the 1950s, and he published no original novels after 1961.  By the time of Kilgore Trout's first appearance (in 1965's God Bless You, Mr. Rosewater), both Vonnegut and Sturgeon had moved to different cities, and Vonnegut had begun to be perceived as a mainstream author.

The "Kilgore Trout" name was a transparent reference to the older writer (substituting "Kilgore" for "Theodore" and "Trout" for "Sturgeon"), but since the characterization was less than flattering (both Sturgeon and Trout were financially unsuccessful and seemingly slipping into obscurity), Vonnegut did not publicly state the connection, nor did Sturgeon encourage the comparison. It was not until after Sturgeon's death in 1985 that Vonnegut explicitly acknowledged the matter, stating in a 1987 interview that "Yeah, it said so in his obituary in The New York Times. I was delighted that it said in the middle of it that he was the inspiration for the Kurt Vonnegut character of Kilgore Trout."

The impetus to create Kilgore Trout as a character, Vonnegut suggested in a 1979 NYPR interview, was the convenience it offered to turn science-fiction plots into humorous parables. "Kilgore Trout was more or less invented by a friend of mine, Knox Burger, who was my editor in the early days. He did not suggest that I do this, but he said, 'You know, the problem with science-fiction? It’s much more fun to hear someone tell the story of the book than to read the story itself.' And it’s true: If you paraphrase a science-fiction story, it comes out as a very elegant joke, and it’s over in a minute or so. It’s a tedious business to read all the surrounding material. So I started summarizing [them], and I suppose I’ve now summarized 50 novels I will never have to write, and spared people the reading of them."

Appearances in Vonnegut books 
Trout appears in several of Vonnegut's books, but the character is deliberately inconsistent as Vonnegut habitually changes major details about his life and circumstances with each appearance. Trout is consistently presented as a prolific but unappreciated science-fiction writer; other details, including his general appearance, demeanor and his dates of birth and death, vary widely from novel to novel.  (Perhaps the most extreme instance of this occurs in Jailbird, wherein "Kilgore Trout" is merely a pseudonym of Dr. Robert Fender, a novelist and prison inmate.)  Vonnegut makes no attempt to reconcile these sometimes extreme differences, and his novels do not form an internally consistent world.

Trout performs a variety of roles in Vonnegut's works: he acts as a catalyst for the main characters in Breakfast of Champions, God Bless You, Mr. Rosewater, and Slaughterhouse-Five, while in others, such as Jailbird and Timequake, Trout is an active character who is vital to the story. Trout is also described differently in several books; in Breakfast of Champions, he has, by the end, become something of a father figure, while in other novels, he seems to be something like Vonnegut in the early part of his career. In Hocus Pocus, Trout is not mentioned by name, but the protagonist is deeply affected while reading a Trout-like science fiction story.  In early novels, Kilgore Trout lives in Ilium, New York, a fictional town whose name is based on Troy, New York (Illium was the Roman name for ancient Troy and Vonnegut lived and worked in nearby Schenectady for some time). In later novels, Trout inhabits a basement apartment in Cohoes, an ailing mill community. While living in Cohoes, Trout works as an installer of "aluminum combination storm windows and screens." The ghost of Trout's son, Leon Trotsky Trout, is the narrator of the novel Galápagos.

Trout, who has supposedly written over 117 novels and over 2,000 short stories, is usually described as an unappreciated science fiction writer whose works are used only as filler material in pornographic magazines. However, he does have at least three fans: Eliot Rosewater and Billy Pilgrim—both Vonnegut characters—have a near-complete collection of Trout's work or have read most of his work; in Galápagos, Leon Trotsky Trout goes on leave in Thailand and meets an unnamed Swedish doctor who is a fan of Kilgore Trout. This doctor helps Leon desert the US Marine Corps and defect to Sweden, where he receives political asylum as a conscientious objector to the Vietnam War.

Vonnegut revised Trout's biography on several occasions. In Breakfast of Champions, he is born in 1907 and dies in 1981. In Timequake, he lives from 1917 to 2001. Both death dates are set in the future as of the time the novels were written. More recently, in an article for In These Times Vonnegut "reports" that Kilgore Trout commits suicide by drinking Drāno. Trout "dies" at midnight on October 15, 2004, in Cohoes following his consultation with a psychic, who informs him that George W. Bush would once again win the U. S. Presidential election by a vote of 5-to-4 in the Supreme Court. The epitaph on his tombstone reads, "Life is no way to treat an animal."

In Breakfast of Champions, Kilgore Trout has part of his right ring finger bitten off by the book's other main character, Dwayne Hoover, when Kilgore attends an arts festival in the Midwest. Trout also has an encounter with his creator, Mr. Vonnegut, in the final chapter.  Vonnegut tells him that he is setting him free, in much the same way that Leo Tolstoy freed his serfs, and that the rest of his life will be much happier: his work will be republished by reputable publishers, and his ideas will become very influential, leading to him winning the Nobel Prize for medicine.  However, Vonnegut cannot grant Trout's request to "make me young."

In Jailbird (1979), Kilgore Trout is revealed to be the only lifer in the Federal Minimum Security Adult Correctional Facility near Finletter Air Force Base, Georgia. Jailbird, narrated by the fictional character Walter F. Starbuck, shows Kilgore Trout to be the only American convicted of treason during the Korean War. Kilgore Trout is the pseudonym of (the equally fictional) Dr. Robert Fender, whose doctorate is in veterinary science. While in prison, Fender also writes many science fiction novels under another pseudonym, Frank X. Barlow, and works as the chief clerk in the supply room of the prison.

Galápagos is narrated by Leon Trotsky Trout (1946–1986), the son and only child of Kilgore Trout. Leon ran away at the age of 16, ashamed of his father, and never had any contact with him thereafter, until his death, when Kilgore appeared at the door of the "blue tunnel" that leads to the Afterlife. Kilgore appears at the door to the tunnel, urging his son to enter and proceed to the Afterlife. Three times Leon refuses, on the grounds that he wants to see more of human life in the hope of understanding it. During Kilgore's fourth appearance at the entrance to the blue tunnel, he threatens his son: if Leon doesn't leave the Earth immediately, the blue tunnel won't appear again for one million years. Since Kilgore has never lied to Leon, Leon knows this will come true. He is momentarily distracted by events on Earth, and the tunnel disappears. Galápagos contains several flashback scenes that explain the breakup between Kilgore and his wife. Leon states that he became a US Marine because his father was one. Trout's appearance in Galápagos is somewhat problematic for Vonnegut's continuity because the novel explicitly states that Kilgore dies before 1986, when the events of the novel take place. Yet Timequake finds him alive more than ten years later. In Galápagos, Leon uses his omniscient status as a ghost to confirm that he never fathered a child, so that Kilgore never had any descendants.

In Timequake Kilgore's creed is "You were sick, but now you are well again. And there's work to be done." The novel also features Trout's last and presumably only poem:

It is stated in Timequake that Trout's father killed his mother when Trout was 12. This influences Trout later in life, when he is shown to say the phrase "ting-a-ling" whenever greeted or asked any questions.

Trout accidentally becomes a great hero, rescuing many lives after the timequake, and finally receives a measure of acclaim: he spends his last days in a literary colony, honored for his heroism and some of his discarded works, which were preserved by a security guard.

In A Man Without a Country, Vonnegut receives a brief phone call on January 20, 2004, from Kilgore Trout in which they discuss George W. Bush's State of the Union Address and the imminent death of the Earth due to human carelessness.

In God Bless You, Dr. Kevorkian, Vonnegut's final interview is with Trout.

In other works 

At least one actual published work is attributed to Kilgore Trout: the novel Venus on the Half-Shell, written by Philip José Farmer but published under the name "Kilgore Trout". For some time it was assumed that Vonnegut must have written it; when the truth of its authorship came out, Vonnegut was reported as being "not amused"; in an issue of the semi-pro zine Science Fiction Review, published by Richard E. Geis, Geis claimed to have received an angry, obscenity-laden telephone call from Vonnegut about what Farmer had said about the book in Geis's zine.

Trout is referred to in Salman Rushdie's magical realism novel The Ground Beneath Her Feet—"Books by famous American writers... science fiction by Kilgore Trout..."

Trout was portrayed by Albert Finney in the 1999 film version of Breakfast of Champions, directed by Alan Rudolph.

In the novel Fallen Angels by Larry Niven, Jerry Pournelle and Michael Flynn, the folksinging fan Jenny Trout (a character based on real-life filksinger Leslie Fish) is said to be the daughter of Kilgore Trout.

In The League of Extraordinary Gentlemen: Black Dossier, Trout is referenced in passing as having written stories for a gentleman's magazine called Stagman, an obvious reference to 1950s men's magazines such as Stag, which existed a level beneath the relative acceptability of Playboy.

In The World of Kurt Vonnegut: The Bell Curse, by Kevin G. Summers, Trout appears for the first time in a licensed work.

In the Capcom video game Breath of Fire II for the Super Nintendo Entertainment System, two rival aristocrats are named Kilgore and Trout.

Works by Kilgore Trout

Novels
 Barring-gaffner of Bagnialto or This Year's Masterpiece (novel mentioned in Breakfast of Champions)
 The Big Board (novel mentioned in Slaughterhouse-Five)
 The Era of Hopeful Monsters (novel mentioned in Galápagos)
 First District Court of Thankyou (novel mentioned in Jailbird and God Bless You, Mr. Rosewater)
 The Gospel from Outer Space (novel mentioned in Slaughterhouse-Five)
 The Gutless Wonder (novel mentioned in Slaughterhouse-Five)
 How You Doin'? (novel mentioned in Breakfast of Champions)
 Maniacs in the Fourth Dimension (novel mentioned in Slaughterhouse-Five)
 The Money Tree (novel mentioned in Slaughterhouse-Five)
 Now It Can Be Told (novel mentioned in Breakfast of Champions)
 Oh Say Can You Smell? (novel mentioned in God Bless You, Mr. Rosewater)
 The Pan-Galactic Memory Bank (novel mentioned in Breakfast of Champions)
 The Pan-Galactic Straw Boss a.k.a. Mouth Crazy (novel mentioned in Breakfast of Champions)
 The Pan-Galactic Three-Day Pass (novel mentioned in God Bless You, Mr. Rosewater)
 Plague on Wheels (novel mentioned in Breakfast of Champions)
 The Smart Bunny (novel mentioned in Breakfast of Champions)
 The Son of Jimmy Valentine (novel mentioned in Breakfast of Champions)
 2BR02B (novel mentioned in God Bless You, Mr. Rosewater)
 Venus on the Half-Shell (novel first mentioned in God Bless You, Mr. Rosewater)

Short stories
 "Albert Hardy" (short story mentioned in Timequake)
 "An American Family Marooned on the Planet Pluto" (short story mentioned in Timequake)
 "Asleep at the Switch" (short story mentioned in Jailbird)
 "Bunker Bingo Party" (short story mentioned in Timequake)
 "The Dancing Fool" (short story mentioned in Breakfast of Champions)
 "Dog's Breakfast" (short story mentioned in Timequake)
 "Dr. Schadenfreude" (short story mentioned in Timequake)
 "Empire State" (short story mentioned in Timequake)
 "Gilgongo!" (short story mentioned in Breakfast of Champions)
 "Golden Wedding" (short story mentioned in Timequake)
 "Hail to the Chief" (short story mentioned in Breakfast of Champions)
 "No Laughing Matter" (short story mentioned in Timequake)
 "The Planet Gobblers" (short story mentioned in Palm Sunday)
 "The Protocols of the Elders of Tralfamadore" (short story mentioned in Hocus Pocus" – no author attributed, but bears many elements characteristic of Trout's work. Tralfamadore is mentioned by Eliot Rosewater in God Bless You, Mr. Rosewater. Tralfamadore is also a main element of the plots of The Sirens of Titan and Slaughterhouse-Five)
 "The Sisters B-36" (short story mentioned in Timequake)
 "This Means You" (short story mentioned in Breakfast of Champions)

Memoir
 My Ten Years on Automatic Pilot (nonfiction book mentioned in Timequake)

Play
 The Wrinkled Old Family Retainer (play mentioned in Timequake'')

References 

Author surrogates
Characters in American novels of the 20th century
Characters in American novels of the 21st century
Fictional characters from New York (state)
Fictional writers
Kurt Vonnegut characters
Literary characters introduced in 1965
Fictional people from the 20th-century